Phimophis guerini is a species of colubrid snake in the subfamily Dipsadinae.
It is endemic to South America.

Distribution and habitat
The species has been recorded from open areas and savannahs in Argentina, Brazil and Paraguay.

References

Colubrids
Reptiles described in 1854
Taxa named by André Marie Constant Duméril
Taxa named by Gabriel Bibron
Taxa named by Auguste Duméril